Dankowice  is a village in the administrative district of Gmina Żukowice, within Głogów County, Lower Silesian Voivodeship, in southwestern Poland.

References

Villages in Głogów County